Saint John the Baptist Church, is an Armenian Apostolic church in Nagorno-Karabakh, in the town of Martakert. The church was built in 1883. There is a cemetery adjacent to the church. The church possibly originates from as early as the 13th century, built between 1216 and 1238. The church was renovated in 2003.

Gallery

References 

Armenian Apostolic churches
Churches in the Republic of Artsakh
19th-century Oriental Orthodox church buildings
Churches completed in 1883
1883 establishments in the Russian Empire